James Grueneich is an American politician who served as a member of the North Dakota House of Representatives for the 12th district from 2016 to 2020.

Education 
Grueneich attended the Alexandria Technical and Community College.

Career 
A veteran of the United States Air Force, Grueneich was elected to the North Dakota House of Representatives in 2016. Grueneich resigned from the House in February 2020 after moving outside his district. He was succeeded by Mitch Ostlie.

Personal life 
Grueneich is married and has three children. He is a member of the Benevolent and Protective Order of Elks and the Shriners.

References

Year of birth missing (living people)
Living people
Republican Party members of the North Dakota House of Representatives
United States Air Force airmen
21st-century American politicians
Alexandria Technical and Community College alumni